Złota Kaczka (Polish for "Gold Duck") is a mythical creature popular in the folk-lore of Warsaw, Poland.

Story
According to one story, recorded by poet-journalist Artur Oppman, the duck dwells in the cellars beneath Warsaw's Ostrogski Castle (now home to the Fryderyk Chopin Museum). The creature, a princess who has been bewitched by an evil sorcerer, lives under the Castle and waits for someone to set her free.

The Duck can be restored to human form only by a man who can spend 100 gold ducats a day for three consecutive days, without sharing any of this small fortune with anyone. 
  
Two versions of the story have similar endings:

 A poor shoemaker's apprentice finds the Gold Duck under the Castle and is granted the ducats to spend, but is unable to spend them all in the allotted time.  He gives the remainder to a beggar, who tells him that money does not bring happiness. The Gold Duck disappears, taking with it the treasures stored under the Castle, but from that day the boy is happy. He becomes a master shoemaker, finds himself a beautiful wife, and lives into old age, surrounded by happy friends and children.
 A soldier finds the Duck and is granted the ducats.  He is close to exhausting them when he gives a beggar his last penny.  The Duck disappears, together with the whole Castle.

Notes

References
 Encyklopedia Polski

External links 

Złota Kaczka (Warszawskie legendy) {Written in Polish}

Culture in Warsaw
Polish legends
Ducks in literature
Slavic legendary creatures